Zaporizhzhya National University (ZNU) is a State-sponsored university in Zaporizhzhia, Ukraine. Its full name is "Zaporizhzhya National University of the Ministry of Education, Youth and Sports of Ukraine."

On August 11, 1930, Sovnarkom Ukraine approved the list of 27 institutes and departments, including the Zaporizhzhya Institute of Education. In 1931, the Institute of Education was renamed the Pedagogical Institute of Vocational Education. It was once again renamed the Zaporozhye State Pedagogical Institute in 1933.

The first issue of teachers took place in 1932, according to the Council of Ministers of the USSR of 21.09.1982 № 872. At the opening of Zaporozhye of the State University the Council of Ministers of the Ukrainian USSR from 28.09.1982 Number 478 and the order of the USSR Ministry of 28.10.1982 № 1090 on the subject - "On the basis of Zaporozhye State Pedagogical Institute by the Ministry of Higher and Secondary Special Education of the Ukrainian SSR from 16.08.1985" Number 212 was created Zaporozhye State University.

Decision DAKU 30.03.2010, the Zaporizhzhia State University is accredited by the fourth level in general. Since 1995 it has an educational and scientific complex Zaporizhzhya University, which includes institutes, colleges, technical schools and about 50 schools in the city and region.

Zaporizhzhia State University has been a member of the European University Association (EATE) since 1999.

In 2003, ZNU became a member of the International Association of Sociology and Administration.

In 2004, ZNU became a member of the Ukrainian Association of Educational Management. On December 24, 2004, the President of Ukraine granted it the status of National University.

In 2008, Zaporizhzhia National University opened its Economics and Law Schools.

On February 1, 2009 -it was subjected to Shopping college.

On March 30, 2009 the Economics and Humanities Schools were created in Melitopol.

On November 18, 2011, the Zaporizhzhia National University was admitted into the Eurasian Association of Universities.

In 2011, it opened 13 new majors.

On October 17, 2018 Zaporizhia State Engineering Academy was reorganized to become the Industrial Institute of Zaporizhzhia National University.

In June 2022, ZNU was twinned with Durham University in the United Kingdom as part of an initiative sponsored by Universities UK and the Ministry of Education and Science of Ukraine.

Campus and building
1 Training Corps News: 
Department of Physics;
Edition;
Human Resources;
Center for Information Technology;
Reception of the Rector;
Museum News;
General Department;
Department of International Relations and Work with Foreign Students;
Reception vice-chancellors of research and educational work;
Banquet hall;
Laboratory theory and methods of teaching Physics .. O. Sergeyev. 

2 Training Corps News:
Research Library;
Hall Research Library electronic resources;
Center intensive foreign language;
Resource Center for American studies;
Admissions;
Faculty of Journalism;
Philology;
Faculty of Foreign Languages;
Economics and Law College;
Assembly Hall;
Chamber;
Department of organizational work, control and treatment;
Council of Young Scientists. 

3 Training Corps News:
Regional Research and Production Center "Ecology";
Faculty of Biology.

4 Training Corps News:
Department of Accounting, Financial and Budgetary Reporting;
Department of Educational Work;
Academic Council;
Student Council;
Union Committee;
Faculty of Physical Education;
Department of Philosophy;
Cabinet Anatomy behalf of Dr. Levin;
Student sector unions;
Cabinet patent-licensing of Scientific Research;
Postgraduate and Doctoral Studies;
Administrative and Economic part;
Employment Services;
Department of Law;
Division of Academic Affairs;
Settlement Department;
Planning and Finance Department;
Department of Public Procurement;
Center of cultural work;
Civil Defense Headquarters;
Department of Labor;
Scientific and Technical Council;
Scientific Association of Students;
Technical Department;
Service for Social Development. 

5 Training Corps News:
Faculty of Economics;
Faculty of History;
Faculty of Mathematics.

6 Training Corps News:
Faculty of Management;
Faculty of Sociology and Management;
Sanatorium;
Student Infirmary;
Department of Monitoring Educational Quality and Licensing;
Center of Postgraduate;
Center for Foreign Languages. 

7 Training Corps (Sports Complex)
Gym;
Sports Floor;
Sports Facilities. 

8 Training Corps News:
Faculty of Social Pedagogy and Psychology;
Educational Theatre Department Acting. Biostation-dispensary on the island. Greyhound;
WTO "Slavutich" (village Kirillovka, Zaporozhye.);
Room for Students (lecture rooms, classrooms, laboratories, etc.) - 78338.4 m2;
Facilities for Research and Pedagogical (teaching) Staff - 4605.3 m2;
Office Space - 3790.5 m2;
Library (including reading rooms) - 2203.6 m2;
Dining, Buffets - 3344.4 m2;
Preventive, Recreation - 5379.6 m2;
Medical Centers - 140,7 m2.

Institutes and faculties
Departments:
Mathematics;
Physics;
Economic;
History;
Biology;
Philology;
Legal;
Faculty of Foreign Languages;
Faculty of Physical Education;
Faculty of Social pedagogy and Psychology;
Faculty of Management;
Faculty of Sociology and Management;
Faculty of Journalism;
Separated units Students;
Crimean Faculty;
Rig Faculty;
Nikopoly Faculty;
Economy and Humanities Faculty News in;
Melitopoly;
Economy and Law College;
Trading College.

Honorable doctors and famous alumni
Poet Peter Ridge
Producer Vladislav Riashyn
Finalist television project "Dancing with the stars" Vladislav Yama
Journalist radio "Freedom" 
Mathematician Roman Vershynin 
The writer Paul Volvach 
Champion games HHIV Olympics in Seoul Tatyana Samoilenko-Dorovskykh 
Four world boxing champion Wladimir Sidorenko
World Champion boxing, WBA Valeriy Sidorenko 
A bronze medalist in Sydney with diving Elena Zhupina 
Silver medalist in Sydney in swimming Denis Sylantyev 
World Heavyweight Champion Professional Boxer Wladimir Klitschko 
3 time Croquet World Champion Kennedy Gundy
And many others

References

External links
Official site

Universities and colleges in Zaporizhzhia
National universities in Ukraine
Institutions with the title of National in Ukraine